The Thomas P. "Tip" O'Neill Federal Building is an administrative center of the U.S. federal government in Boston, Massachusetts. Named for former Massachusetts congressman and Speaker of the House of Representatives Tip O'Neill, the building houses the New England regional offices of numerous federal agencies, e.g. the Social Security Administration, the Peace Corps, Boston Passport Agency, etc. It is located at 10 Causeway Street.

History
Built in 1986, the building is named after Thomas Phillip "Tip" O'Neill Jr. (1912–1994), Speaker of the House of Representatives from 1977 to 1987. It was built on the site of the former Hotel Manger.

Tenants
 Department of Agriculture; APHIS/PPQ; Food & Nutrition Service 
 Department of Commerce;  Export Enforcement 
 Department of Homeland Security; Office of the Inspector General;  U.S. Secret Service; U.S. Homeland Security Investigations, U.S. Customs & Border Protection
 Department of Housing & Urban Development  
 Department of Justice; Bureau of Alcohol, Tobacco, Firearms & Explosives 
 Department of Labor; Office of Administrative Law Judges 
 Department of State; U.S. Passport Agency, Diplomatic Security 
 Department of the Treasury;  Internal Revenue Service 
 Federal Labor Relations Authority  
 General Services Administration  
 Government Accountability Office  
 Hanscom Federal Credit Union  
 National Labor Relations Board   
 Small Business Administration  
 Social Security Administration  
 Defense Contract Management Agency
 Federal Protective Services
 Census Bureau

Architecture
Built mainly of pink granite, the Thomas P. O'Neill Jr. Federal Building is characterized by intersecting triangular and chamfered-cornered rectangular sections, horizontal ribbon windows, a sheltered entry loggia off Causeway Street, a sequence of round bollards placed along its front elevation to deter traffic and truck bombers, and a large glass atrium that pours sunlight into its center concourse. In 2000 and 2005, the Environmental Protection Agency awarded the structure the Energy Star for its white reflective roofing system, installed to reduce the urban heat island effect, as well as its use of low-VOC (volatile organic compound) paints and recycled-content ceiling tiles and metal studs.

Art installations

References

Image gallery

Buildings of the United States government in Massachusetts
Government Center, Boston
Government buildings in Boston
Office buildings in Boston
West End, Boston
Government buildings completed in 1986
Office buildings completed in 1986
1980s architecture in the United States